John Anthony Castañeda (born December 18, 1991) is an American mixed martial artist who competes in the Bantamweight division of the Ultimate Fighting Championship (UFC). A professional competitor since 2012, he formerly competed for Combate Global.

Background
Castañeda grew up wrestling, which he continued until the end of his freshman year at Minnesota State University, Mankato. He double majored in Criminal Law and Spanish and minored in Social Work.

Professional mixed martial arts career

Early career
Castañeda went 15–1 in amateur competition, and racked a professional record of 7–2 in the regional circuit of Minnesota before signing with Combate Americas. In Combate Americas, Castañeda amassed four straight victories which led to a shot at the inaugural Combate Americas Bantamweight Championship. Castañeda faced Gustavo Lopez at Combate Americas - Empire Rising on October 14, 2016, with the bout being originally being for the championship, however Castañeda missed weight, coming in at 137.5 lbs. He won the bout via fourth-round knockout.

Castañeda was cut from Combate Americas after he refused the rematch against Gustavo Lopez, however he later returned to the promotion, defeating Chris Beal via TKO in the second round at Combate Americas 14.

Dana White's Contender Series
Having racked up a record of 13–2, Castañeda was invited to compete at Dana White's Contender Series 5, facing Cheyden Leialoha. He won the bout via unanimous decision, but was not awarded with a contract to the UFC.

Return to Combate
On October 26, 2017, it was announced that Castañeda would participate in Combate Americas' Copa Combate 2017 one-night tournament that took place on November 11, 2017. In the quarterfinals Castañeda faced Kevin Moreyra, winning by first-round submission. Advancing to the semifinals, he defeated Marc Gomez by unanimous decision. In the tournament final Castañeda faced Levy Marroquín, losing the bout via unanimous decision.

Castañeda was expected to headline Combate Americas Mexico vs. USA against Érik Pérez on October 13, 2018, but the bout was postponed to a later date because Castañeda caught staph infection.

After the tournament, Castañeda went on to lose one and win one bout in Combate Americas before being signed to the UFC on short notice.

Ultimate Fighting Championship
Replacing the mourning Umar Nurmagomedov on short notice on July 26, 2020, Castañeda made his UFC debut against Nathaniel Wood at UFC on ESPN 14. He lost the fight via unanimous decision.

Castañeda faced Eddie Wineland on February 20, 2021 at UFC Fight Night 185. He won the fight via first round technical knockout.

Castañeda faced Miles Johns on February 5, 2022 at UFC Fight Night: Hermansson vs. Strickland. He won the fight via third round technical submission.

Castañeda faced Daniel Santos on October 1, 2022 at UFC Fight Night 211. He lost the bout in the second round, getting knocked out with a knee. This bout earned the Fight of the Night award.

Championships and accomplishments

Mixed martial arts
Ultimate Fighting Championship
Fight of the Night (One time)

Mixed martial arts record

|-
|Loss
|align=center|19–6
|Daniel Santos
|KO (punches and knee)
|UFC Fight Night: Dern vs. Yan
|
|align=center|2
|align=center|4:28
|Las Vegas, Nevada, United States
|
|-
|Win
|align=center|19–5
|Miles Johns
|Technical Submission (arm-triangle choke)
|UFC Fight Night: Hermansson vs. Strickland
|
|align=center|3
|align=center|1:38
|Las Vegas, Nevada, United States
|
|-
|Win
|align=center|18–5
|Eddie Wineland
|TKO (punches)
|UFC Fight Night: Blaydes vs. Lewis 
|
|align=center|1
|align=center|4:44
|Las Vegas, Nevada, United States
|
|-
|Loss
|align=center|17–5
|Nathaniel Wood
|Decision (unanimous)
|UFC on ESPN: Whittaker vs. Till 
|
|align=center|3
|align=center|5:00
|Abu Dhabi, United Arab Emirates
|
|-
|Win
|align=center|17–4
|Marcelo Rojo
|Submission (arm-triangle choke)
|Combate Americas 35
|
|align=center|3
|align=center|2:37
|Monterrey, Mexico
|
|-
|Loss
|align=center|16–4
|José Alday
|Decision (split)
|Combate Americas 20
|
|align=center|3
|align=center|5:00
|Los Angeles, California, United States
|
|-
|Loss
|align=center|16–3
|Levy Marroquín
|Decision (unanimous)
|rowspan=3|Combate Americas 18: Copa Combate
|rowspan=3|
|align=center|3
|align=center|3:00
|rowspan=3|Cancún, Mexico
|
|-
|Win
|align=center|16–2
|Marc Gomez
|Decision (unanimous)
|align=center|3
|align=center|3:00
|
|-
|Win
|align=center|15–2
|Kevin Moreyra
|Submission (rear-naked choke)
|align=center|1
|align=center|4:52
|
|-
|Win
|align=center|14–2
|Cheyden Leialoha
|Decision (unanimous)
|Dana White's Contender Series 4
|
|align=center|3
|align=center|5:00
|Las Vegas, Nevada, United States
|
|-
|Win
|align=center|13–2
|Chris Beal
|TKO (punches)
|Combate Americas 14
|
|align=center|2
|align=center|0:42
|Ventura, California, United States
|
|-
|Win
|align=center|12–2
|Gustavo Lopez
|TKO (punches)
|Combate Americas 9
|
|align=center|4
|align=center|2:24
|Verona, New York, United States
|
|-
|Win
|align=center|11–2
|Angel Cruz
|TKO (punches)
|Combate Americas 8
|
|align=center|2
|align=center|2:25
|Los Angeles, California, United States
|
|-
|Win
|align=center|10–2
|Gabriel Solorio
|Decision (split)
|Combate Americas 6
|
|align=center|3
|align=center|5:00
|Los Angeles, California, United States
|
|-
|Win
|align=center|9–2
|Federico Lopez
|Submission (arm-triangle choke)
|Combate Americas: Road to the Championship 2
|
|align=center|3
|align=center|4:49
|Los Angeles, California, United States
|
|-
|Win
|align=center|8–2
|Justin Governale
|Decision (unanimous)
|Combate Americas: Road to the Championship 1
|
|align=center|3
|align=center|5:00
|Las Vegas, Nevada, United States
|
|-
|Win
|align=center|7–2
|Joe Pearson
|TKO (punches)
|KOTC: Power Surge
|
|align=center|1
|align=center|2:47
|Carlton, Minnesota, United States
|
|-
|Win
|align=center|6–2
|Pedro Velasco
|Submission (rear-naked choke)
|KOTC: Total Dominance
|
|align=center|1
|align=center|2:42
|Carlton, Minnesota, United States
|
|-
|Loss
|align=center|5–2
|Matt Brown
|Decision (split)
|RFA 19: Checco vs. Collier
|
|align=center|3
|align=center|5:00
|Prior Lake, Minnesota, United States
|
|-
|Win
|align=center|5–1
|Ruddy Gray
|TKO (punches)
|Driller Promotions: Live MMA at 7 Clans Casino
|
|align=center|2
|align=center|3:17
|River Falls, Minnesota, United States
|
|-
|Loss
|align=center|4–1
|Matt Brown
|TKO (punches)
|Driller Promotions: Mecca 5
|
|align=center|1
|align=center|2:22
|Prior Lake, Minnesota, United States
|
|-
|Win
|align=center|4–0
|Derrick Mandell
|Decision (unanimous)
|Driller Promotions / SEG: Caged Chaos at Canterbury Park 5
|
|align=center|3
|align=center|5:00
|Shakopee, Minnesota, United States
|
|-
|Win
|align=center|3–0
|Adam Schumacher
|TKO (submission to punches)
|Driller Promotions: Mecca 2
|
|align=center|1
|align=center|3:32
|Prior Lake, Minnesota, United States
|
|-
|Win
|align=center|2–0
|Bruce Johnson
|Submission (rear-naked choke)
|Driller Promotions / SEG: Downtown Showdown 12
|
|align=center|1
|align=center|2:32
|Minneapolis, Minnesota, United States
|
|-
|Win
|align=center|1–0
|Brandon Abrego
|KO (punch)
|Driller Promotions / SEG: Caged Chaos
|
|align=center|1
|align=center|0:36
|Shakopee, Minnesota, United States
|
|}

See also
 List of current UFC fighters
 List of male mixed martial artists

References

External links 
 
 

1991 births
Living people
Sportspeople from Dallas
Mixed martial artists from Texas
Minnesota State Mavericks wrestlers
American male sport wrestlers
Bantamweight mixed martial artists
Mixed martial artists utilizing collegiate wrestling
Mixed martial artists utilizing Brazilian jiu-jitsu
American male mixed martial artists
Ultimate Fighting Championship male fighters
American practitioners of Brazilian jiu-jitsu
Minnesota State University, Mankato alumni